AmeriHost Inn was a small chain of hotels located in the United States and Canada. The chain consisted of two- or three-story interior-corridor buildings constructed based on the company's prototype designs. Properties were usually a long, two- or three-story building with a gabled or lobby and public area at one end. All properties featured indoor pools and consistent amenities, which was the chain's main selling point. Founded in 1989 by (now) Arlington Hospitality, Cendant Corporation purchased the franchise rights in the late 1990s. Arlington continued to build and develop AmeriHost Inns using the prototype it originally created for the chain during this time. However, Cendant granted a small number of AmeriHost franchises to existing properties that do not conform to the original prototype standards, during the start of the millennium. 

In 2006, Cendant (now Wyndham Worldwide) announced that all Amerihost Inns would be rebranded as Baymont Inns. Cendant has ceased using the Amerihost Inn brandname, but retained rights.

References 

Hotels established in 1989
Companies disestablished in 2006
Defunct hotel chains
Wyndham brands